The 1997 Lunar New Year Cup (aka Carlsberg Cup) was a football tournament held in Hong Kong over the first and fourth day of the Chinese New Year holiday.

Participating teams
  Hong Kong League XI (host)

Results
All times given in Hong Kong Time (UTC+8).

Semifinals

Third place match

Final

Bracket

Top scorers
3 goals
  Anto Drobnjak
2 goals
  Igor Simutenkov
  Adrian Kunz
1 goal
  Silva
  Muir
  Patrick Thuler
  Murat Yakin
  Rene Weiler
  Dmitri Popov
  Savo Milosevic

See also
Hong Kong Football Association
Hong Kong First Division League

References
 Carlsberg Cup 1997, Rsssf.com
 XV. Carlsberg Cup Chinese New Years Tournament 1997 - Details, YANSFIELD

1997
1996–97 in Hong Kong football
1996–97 in Yugoslav football
1996–97 in Swiss football
1997 in Russian football